They Watched by Night is a 1941 detective novel  by John Rhode, the pen name of the British writer Cecil Street. It is the thirty fifth in his long-running series of novels featuring Lancelot Priestley, a Golden Age armchair detective. It was published in the United States by Dodd Mead with the alternative title Signal for Death.

References

Bibliography
 Evans, Curtis. Masters of the "Humdrum" Mystery: Cecil John Charles Street, Freeman Wills Crofts, Alfred Walter Stewart and the British Detective Novel, 1920-1961. McFarland, 2014.
 Magill, Frank Northen . Critical Survey of Mystery and Detective Fiction: Authors, Volume 3. Salem Press, 1988.
 Reilly, John M. Twentieth Century Crime & Mystery Writers. Springer, 2015.

1941 British novels
Novels by Cecil Street
British crime novels
British mystery novels
British detective novels
Collins Crime Club books
Novels set in England
Novels set during World War II